Conan Lee Yuen-Ba 李元霸 (born Lloyd Hutchinson; 1959), is a Hong Kong-born American film actor and martial artist.

Early life
Conan Lee was born in Hong Kong, but grew up in Queens, New York as Lloyd Hutchinson. During this period he was trained in his father's self-defense methods. Lee explored a wide variety of both Western and Chinese martial arts. These included Boxing, Kung Fu, Taekwondo and Karate. He excelled in the Northern Shaolin and Wing Chun styles, and eventually created a style called "Realistic Fist".

Career 
Lee is best known for his roles in cult kung fu/ninja hybrid movie Ninja in the Dragon's Den (1982), alongside popular Japanese actor Hiroyuki Sanada, and the crime/comedy buddy cop film Tiger on the Beat with Chow Yun-fat. Other notable TV and film appearances include MacGyver, Armed Response (with David Carradine), New York Cop (with Chad McQueen), Aces Go Places V: The Terracotta Hit (appearing as Rambo), First Strike, Lethal Weapon 4, and the 1986 science fiction action film Eliminators.

Lee stopped acting in the 1990s due to his mother's ailing health. This resulted in the production of Hemoxygen, a range of nutritional supplements.

In 2009, Lee made a brief appearance in an episode of the popular American crime series Numb3rs. Lee also voiced several characters in the 2012 video game Sleeping Dogs.

Filmography

Film

Television

References

External links
Personal Website

American male film actors
Hong Kong emigrants to the United States
Living people
1959 births